The Kansas Jayhawks baseball team represents the University of Kansas and competes in the Big 12 Conference of NCAA Division I.

History
Baseball has been played at the University of Kansas since 1880.

In 1993, Kansas had arguably its best season to date. That year the Jayhawks went to the 1993 College World Series in Omaha, NE. This was their first, and so far, only CWS appearance. The Jayhawks were led by All-Americans Jeff Berblinger, Jeff Neimeier and Jimmy Walker into the Mideast Regional in Knoxville, Tenn. After losing their first game to Fresno State, 7–4, the Jayhawks rebounded against host Tennessee for a 3–2 win. Jayhawk Freshman Jamie Splittorff, son of former Kansas City Royal Paul Splittorff, got the win for KU going 8 innings. KU then trounced Rutgers, 8–2, and Clemson, 9–1, to set up the all important re-match with Fresno State. Jayhawk coach Dave Bingham turned to Walker, who had been a reliever all season for KU, to start the Regional Final. Walker didn't disappoint as he pitched a complete game and the Jayhawks won in 10 innings, with some late game magic. Down 2–1 in the bottom of the ninth with one out, Berblinger tripled. One out later, Berblinger scored on Josh Igou's infield hit to force extra innings. In the tenth, Brent Wilhelm scored on Darryl Monroe's hot shot to short stop. Once in Omaha the joy was short-lived, as the Jayhawks lost to Texas A&M, and then Long Beach State for an early exit.

The Jayhawks returned to the Regionals in 1994, earning a bid to the Atlantic II Regional in Tallahassee, Fla.

The Jayhawks would once again find themselves in a regional in the 2006 NCAA Division I baseball tournament after winning the 2006 Big 12 baseball tournament. That year KU traveled to Corvallis, Oregon for the Corvallis Regional. KU went 1–2 and did not advance.

The Jayhawks made the 2009 NCAA Division I baseball tournament as a 3 seed in the Chapel Hill Regional and went 2–2. They went 1–1 against 2-seed Coastal Carolina, defeated 4-seed Dartmouth, and were finally knocked out by 1-seed and regional winner North Carolina in the last game of the regional.

In 2014, the Jayhawks made their 5th NCAA tournament appearance, but were eliminated after finishing 1–2 in the Louisville Regional.

First team All-Americans
1954 – John Trombold, OF (ABCA)
1980 – Matt Gundelfinger, DH (ABCA)
1993 – Jeff Berblinger, 2B (NCBWA)
1996 – Josh Kliner, 2B (ABCA, Baseball America)
2006 – Don Czyz, P (NCBWA)

MLB players

Current
Sam Freeman, Pitcher, Atlanta Braves
Mike Zagurski, Relief pitcher, Yokohoma DeNA Baystars
 Wes Benjamin, Pitcher, Texas Rangers
Source:

Former

See also
List of NCAA Division I baseball programs

References

2009 Kansas Baseball Quick Facts
Kansas Baseball History

External links